Sabine Moritz (born 1969 in Quedlinburg) is a German painter and graphic designer. She is married to Gerhard Richter.

Life and work
Sabine Moritz was born as the daughter of a chemist in East Germany. From 1973 to 1981 she lived together with her family in a high-density housing area of Lobeda in Neulobeda. Before emigrating to West Germany in 1985 she lived in Jena for 4 years. In 1988 she started her studies at the Hochschule für Gestaltung Offenbach (The Offenbach University of Art and Design) at the class of Adam Jankowski. From 1991 she continued her studies at the Kunstakademie Düsseldorf (Academy of Art Düsseldorf). At first she was in the class of Markus Lüpertz but changed to Gerhard Richter’s in the following year. She was the last student to be accepted to his class as he had planned to lay his teaching career to rest in 1994.

In the years 1991 and 1992 she created the series of drawings Lobeda that consists of more than 100 pencil drawings. In 2009 they were discovered in the artist's studio by the curator Hans Ulrich Obrist and the publisher Walther König and subsequently published in 2010 by  These works were shown in the Kunsthaus Sans Titre in Potsdam from August to September in 2011. Later that year the book Jena, Düsseldorf was published, again by Walther König.

Sabine Moritz has been married to her former teacher, Gerhard Richter, since 1995. They have three children and live in Cologne.

Sabine Moritz as a model
Gerhard Richter has used his wife in many paintings. Two paintings – Reader (CR: 799-1 und 804) and Small Bather (CR: 815-1) from 1994 – depict her, although she remains anonymous through the non-descriptive titles. Both these paintings were made from a photographic original just as Richter has created throughout his artistic career. They also both allude to famous paintings: Reader draws influences from Jan Vermeer's Woman in Blue Reading a Letter (1663/64) and Jean-Honoré Fragonard's A Young Girl Reading (c. 1776). The Small Bather theme has an iconic predecessor in Jean-Auguste-Dominique Ingres’ painting with the same title.

In 1995 Richter painted a series, which depict his wife with their eldest son Moritz as an infant known under the title S. with Child (CR: 827-1 bis 827-8). These works can closely be associated with the Madonna with Child topos.

Richter's portrait of his wife Head (sketch) was sold at auction for US$2,33 million by Christie's in 2010.

Literature

Limbo: Paintings from 2005

Limbo is the catalogue accompanying the exhibition that was held at the Andrew Mummery Gallery, London from 15.2. to 18.3.2006. The two predominate themes are war and still lifes – orchids, roses, lilies in vases. This series deals with the interspace, the limbo, between these two seemingly juxtaposed topics. It is about balancing the beauty of the one with the horrors of the other and finding a way of coping with both.

Roses

The publication Roses is a collection of 37 drawings created between 2004 and 2009 accompanied by two poems (The Green Windbreaker by Adam Zagajewski and The Sick Rose by William Blake). Through the different usage of the media charcoal, pastels and oil pastels Moritz displays a versatile approach.

Lobeda and JENA Düsseldorf

During a visit to the artist's studio in 2009 the curator of the Serpentine Gallery, London Hans Ulrich Obrist accidentally discovered a large amount of drawings from the early 1990s. These images depict Moritz’ formative years growing up in East Germany (1969–85). Two years after having started her art studies, she started to process and come to terms with this time period by sketching her recollections of houses, squares and interiors and at times personal experiences from memory. This extensive collection was naturally divided into two halves, the first dealing with Lobeda and the second with Jena.

Lilies and Objects

Originally this publication was planned as a collection of Sabine Moritz’ charcoal and oil pastel drawings of flowers. She has returned to this theme time and time again and explains “Sometimes I draw to relax or when coming down from completing a painting.”  Although she has drawn asters, orchids and roses, it is the lily and its almost architectural nature that pulls her in time and again and has helped her explore different methods. During the development of this compilation the artist herself suggested including drawings of objects. This on-going body of work show her interest the knick-knacks with which people surround themselves, them being of religious nature or just for decorative purposes.

Helicopter

This publication presents Sabine Moritz's latest work: a collection of drawings and paintings of helicopters created between 2002 and 2013. The Helicopter series has arisen from the artist's interest in the shift in their symbolic meaning. They are based on images of helicopters from newspapers and television that the artist transferred into her own language. The outcome is a series of beautiful drawings and paintings that range from objective depictions of helicopters to more poetic compositions. The works are accompanied by poems by Adam Zagajewski and Friedrich Hölderlin, and a text by Hans Ulrich Obrist.

 Sabine Moritz, Limbo: Paintings from 2005, Andrew Mummery Gallery, London, 2006 (exhibition catalogue)
 Sabine Moritz, Roses, Heni Publishing, London, 2010, 
 Sabine Moritz, Lobeda, Verlag der Buchhandlung Walther König, Cologne, 2010, 
 Sabine Moritz, Jena Düsseldorf, Buchhandlung Walther König, Cologne, 2011, 
 Sabine Moritz, Lilies and Objects, Heni Publishing, London, 2011, 
 Sabine Moritz, Limbo 2013, Marian Goodman Gallery, New York, 2013, 
 Sabine Moritz, Concrete and Dust, Foundation de 11 Lijnen, 2014, 
 Sabine Moritz, Bilder und Zeichnungen 1991-2013, Verlag der Buchhandlung Walther König, 2014, 
 Sabine Moritz, Lobeda-Ost 1981 (Edition of 100), Nieves, 2014, Zurich
 Sabine Moritz, Helicopter, Heni Publishing, London, 2014,

Exhibitions (excerpt)

Sabine Moritz is represented by Marian Goodman Gallery.

2005: Zementa, group show with Jenny Rosemeyer and Jan Stieding, Felix Ringel Galerie, Düsseldorf, Germany

2006: Sabine Moritz: Limbo. Paintings from 2005, Andrew Mummery Gallery, London, UK

2009: Transvisions, Strombeek/Brussels, Belgium

2010: The Good, The Bad & the Ugly, Cultuurcentrum Mechelen, Mechelen, Belgium

2010: Awakenings, group show, Felix Ringel Galerie, Düsseldorf, Germany

2011: Sabine Moritz: Lobeda, Kunsthaus sans titre, Potsdam, Germany

2011: Sabine Moritz: Lilies and Objects, art@goldensquare, London, UK

2012: Faber-Castel International Drawing Award 2012, Neues Museum - Staatliches Museum für Kunst und Design, Nuremberg, Germany

2012: Sabine Moritz: Bilder, Felix Ringel Galerie, Düsseldorf, Germany

2012: Sabine Moritz: Jena Düsseldorf, art@goldensquare, London, UK

2013: Sabine Moritz: Limbo, Galerie Marian Goodman, Paris, France

2013/2014: Sabine Moritz: Concrete and Dust, Foundation de 11 Lijnen, Oudenburg, Belgium

2014: Sabine Moritz, Von der Heydt Kunsthalle, Wuppertal-Barmen, Germany

References

External links
 Sabine Moritz Website 
 Richard Rabensaat: Das Nashorn ist verschwunden - Kultur in Potsdam. In: Potsdamer Neueste Nachrichten 30. August 2011* 
 Niklas Maak: Erinnerung an eine Stadt. In: Frankfurter Allgemeine Zeitung 3. December 2012
 Exhibition video: Sabine Moritz: JENA Düsseldorf, London, 2012
 Speech at Opening of JENA Düsseldorf by Hans Ulrich Obrist

1969 births
Living people
20th-century German painters
21st-century German painters
German women painters
German contemporary artists
20th-century German women
21st-century German women